The Northern Ireland (St Andrews Agreement) Act 2007 (c 4) is an Act of the Parliament of the United Kingdom. The Act extended the statutory deadline for the restoration of the Northern Ireland Assembly to 8 May 2007.

See also
Northern Ireland Act

References
Halsbury's Statutes,

External links
The Northern Ireland (St Andrews Agreement) Act 2007, as amended from the National Archives.
The Northern Ireland (St Andrews Agreement) Act 2007, as originally enacted from the National Archives.
Explanatory notes to the Northern Ireland (St Andrews Agreement) Act 2007.

United Kingdom Acts of Parliament 2007
Acts of the Parliament of the United Kingdom concerning Northern Ireland
2007 in Northern Ireland